Calytrix purpurea is a species of plant in the myrtle family Myrtaceae that is endemic to Western Australia.

It usually blooms between September and December producing purple star-shaped flowers.

Found on sand plains and sand dunes in an area along the west coast of the Mid West region of Western Australia where it grows on sandy soils often over laterite.
 
The species was first formally described as Lhotzkya purpurea by the botanist Ferdinand von Mueller in 1859 in the work Fragmenta Phytographiae Australiae. It was reclassified in the genus Calytrix by Lyndley Craven in 1987 in the article A taxonomic revision of Calytrix Labill. (Myrtaceae) in the journal Brunonia.

References

purpurea
Endemic flora of Western Australia
Rosids of Western Australia
Vulnerable flora of Australia
Plants described in 1987
Taxa named by Ferdinand von Mueller